Nat Thewphaingam, better known by his stage name Natthew, is a Thai singer, actor, model, presenter and the winner of the 5th Season of reality talent show TrueVisions' Academy Fantasia in Thailand.

Biography
Nat Thewphaigam (stage name Natthew), was born on 5 June 1989, the second child of three siblings. He graduated with a bachelor's degree in management from the Faculty of Business Administration, Kasetsart University. His hobbies include playing the saxophone, drawing Cartoons, collecting and building Gundam robots. His motto is to follow and pursue his dreams with determination to achieve his goals. Natthew was the winner of Thailand's Academy Fantasia Show Season 5 in 2008. He acted on the BBTV Channel 7 during 2009 – 2014. Presently, he is the only the artist part of True Fantasia Group and CJ E&M.

Because Natthew's idol is Nichkhun from 2 PM, he was inspired to compete at the international level, especially in South Korea, to show that there are artists in Thailand just as talented as Nichkhun. CJ Entertainment, (a subsidiary of CJ Group in South Korea), hired Natthew as singer and artist in the joint Korean-Thai "New Natthew Project".

Natthew is also involved in a number of charity works, most notably singing for the Japan Charity Live Concert, South Charity Live Concert, and Clean Up Day Together We Can BIG CLEAN UP DAY TOGETHER WE CAN.

Debut in Korea
Natthew, the winner of Thailand's Academy Fantasia, an audition program similar to Mnet's Superstar K, traveled to Korea as part of the Korean-Thai joint project, "New Natthew Project". Through the joint venture by CJ E&M and Thailand's CP Group, the singer was assisted by a full staff to not only make his Korean debut but with the aim for him to become a global star. In Korea, Natthew would undergo a rigorous K-Pop style training regimen to take his image beyond a ballad singer to a global star.
 
Natthew said about his new ventures, "I′m aiming to be recognized by Korean fans as an artist instead of remaining a foreign singer who has thought to visit Korea. I hope to become an artist that helps the exchange of culture between Thailand and Korea."

Natthew created a fan club which he dubbed "Universe," because he sees his fans like the stars that are always in the sky, even when invisible during the daytime. When Natthew faces difficulties, just as the stars are always present, his fans are always there to look to for encouragement.

New Natthew Project
Through the "New Natthew Project", Natthew evolved into a bigger star in Korea. Natthew's first Korean MV single "She's Bad" and stage debut on M! Countdown premiered on 15 November 2012. "She's Bad" is a stylish and powerful electronic piece; the song was composed by C-Luv, who composed K-pop star Rain's "Love Song". Featured in the music video for "She's Bad" are Yong Jun-hyung from Beast, and Brave Girls' Seo-a. Natthew's logo was designed by South Korean actress Jaekyung from the girl group Rainbow. Natthew also performed in the Mnet Asian Music Awards (MAMA) in Hong Kong on 30 November 2012.

In April 2013, Natthew released "오 제발 (Oh Please)", a single from "Nine: Time Travelling Nine Times (나인: 아홉 번의 시간 여행) Part 3", a Korean drama that broadcast on the TVN network 11 March – 14 May 2013. It's a fantasy melodrama about a TV anchorman, Park Sun Woo (Lee Jin Wook) who is in love with new reporter Joo Min Young (Jo Yoon Hee) and is given nine chances to travel back in time to solve a crime that happened 20 years ago.

Projects in 2014
Since 9 June 2014, Natthew has worked in South Korea as a CJ E&M artist. He lives in South Korea where he works hard in dance and vocal training classes plus gains musical experience in his spare time with his Korean friends. From his rigorous training in vocal and dance classes, he was given the opportunity to be guest singer in the song "All of Me" during a July 2014 mini-concert by Korean bands Black Muso and Nine gray at Evans Lounge in Hongdae.

On 12 November, he pre-released a cover of Roy Kim's "Don't Know How". On 13 November, Natthew released a new title song entitled "Love will be OK (할게)" that featured Son Ho Young of G.o.d. and Park Boram. His new single was released with a show performance on the comeback stage at Mnet M! Countdown. He performed in several media outlets including The Show (SBS MTV), Show Champion (MBC), Music Bank (KBS) and Simply K-Pop (Arirang TV). On Natthew's comeback event, he received support from two veteran Korean performers, Son Ho Young and Roy Kim, plus from his friends in Korea and Thailand, especially his fan group "Universe".

Natthew is featured in the single "The Only One" by South Korean girl group Tiny-G, released by Rerun Music on 25 November 2012. Because the song was created by Tiny-G's Thai members Mint and J. Min, it seemed only natural that the duo team up with Bangkok-born singer Natthew.

Korean series
Natthew appeared in the Korean hit music drama TV series Monstar, which depicts the lives of troubled teens who are healed through the power of music. Character Yoon Sul-Chan (Yong Joon-Hyung) is the vocalist for the group "Man in Black" who carries deep psychological wounds but doesn't express his feelings. Because of his hot temper, he causes trouble; his management company then orders him to become an ideal student and he joins a music band at school while facing unexpected events.

Natthew appears in Monstar episodes 4, 7, and 8 as the 21-year-old Nawin Thammarat. Described as musically and athletically talented, Natthew's character ends up meeting Kang Ha Neul's character while busking on the streets of Hongdae. While Nawin Thammarat does not attend Bukchon High School with the rest of the characters, his path quickly intertwines with the other Monstar characters as Nawin slowly reveals his reason for coming to Seoul.

Career

Singer
Natthew's successful debut single "Roo Mai" (รู้ไหม) was released in 2008. In 2009 he joined the band 123 SOUL and produced two other singles, "Sak Khrang (สักครั้ง) and Kha-yap (ขยับ). In 2010, Natthew performed as a solo artist again in The Winner Project. He released two singles, "Muea Chan Dai Bok Rak Thoe Pai Laeo" (เมื่อฉันได้บอกรักเธอไปแล้ว) and "Phro Thoe" (เพราะเธอ). After that, he released the Thai version of the OST, "As Ever/Still" from the "You're Beautiful" the Korean TV series.

Natthew's first album, "Natthew The Passion", was released in April 2011 which included five new songs: "Tor Hai Ther Ja Luem" (ต่อให้เธอจะลืม), "Noy Gwa Rak Mak Gwa Chob" (น้อยกว่ารักมากกว่าชอบ), "Change", "Sa thern jai" (สะเทือนใจ) and, "Love Happens", along with three previous works. The single of the year 2011 was "Kon Samkan" (คนสำคัญ).

After Natthew returned to Thailand, he released the single "Ying Fang Ying Jeb" (ยิ่งฟังยิ่งเจ็บ) or "Oh Please" in the Thai version and invited Thai actress Davika Horne to play appear in a music video. In November 2013, Natthew released a cover single "No Regret To Love You" (ไม่เสียใจที่ได้รักเธอ) for a special event to thank his "Universe" fans who had supported him since he won TrueVisions's Academy Fantasia in 2008. He featured a video from "Natthew Fan Meeting in BKK 2013".

In December 2014, Natthew came back to Thailand for to promote his new single "Love will be OK" in both Korean and Thai versions, (Rak Tae Kae Ma Cha – รักแท้แค่มาช้า). In 2015, his new ballad single "Silent Sorry (ขอโทษในใจ)" was released. This single is special because the lyrics came Natthew's real experiences in love.

Actor
While working in MUSIC FILE, he was also involved in his first-ever Thai TV production, "Wai Puan Kuan La Fun" (วัยป่วนก๊วนล่าฝัน). Earlier in 2011, both of his Thai series "Nuea Ma Nut" (เหนือมนุษย์) and "Sane Bangkok" (เสน่ห์บางกอก) were broadcast. The series "Thida-Wanon 3" (ธิดาวานร 3) was his fourth series. His latest series, "Sue-Saming" (เสือสมิง), aired December 2012, where he played Pha-U and Shwe-Bo (พะอู/ชะเวโบ). In August 2014, Natthew ended his contract as an actor with BBTV Channel 7.

Natthew has played Schlomo Metzenbaum in the Thai version of the musical Fame. In 2012, Natthew played the role of cheerful playboy Pravich Rajpallop (ประวิช ราชพัลลภ) in Prissana the Musical.

Others
Natthew has worked in various areas of showbusiness including music, modeling, and being a brand ambassador. His most notable work to date was his role in the royal musical "Our Land", directed by Euthana Mukdasanit. The film was in celebration of the 83rd birthday of His Majesty the King Bhumibol Adulyadej.

Natthew also represented Thailand in a celebration for the 8th anniversary of Korean broadcasting KBS World by taking part in the "Let's Go! Dream Team" featuring Asian Stars vs. Korean Stars. In 2012, KBS of South Korea chose Natthew to join in the Let's Go! Dream Team with Asian Stars against Korean Stars Season 2 again.

Discography

Studio albums
 2011: Natthew The Passion

Singles

Filmography

Television drama

Musical theatre

Live Concert

Concert participation
2008: The Journey of Love Concert
2009: AF Bachelor Dream Concert
2009: The Greatest of the kings, the greetings of the land
2010: Krungsi Present the 1st 3D Concert – Victory of the Winners
2011: KRUNGSRI AF Comedy Show Must Go On
2012: Concert For You Kon Samkan
2012: The Gentlemen On Stage
2013: The Serenade of My Mine, My Universe
2013: AF5 The Infinity of Dreams Concert 
2013: Natthew Fan Meeting in BKK 2013
2014: The Precious Moment with My Universe Concert
2015: AF Reunion V Fun มันส์ เฟิร์ม 
2016: Eight to Eternity The Eternal Love Concert
2018: A Decade of Love The Concert

Music programs
Natthew performed his 2 singles "She's bad" in 2012 and "Love will be ok" in 2014 on Korean stages.

Awards

See also
 Academy Fantasia

References

External links
Natthew's Twitter
 Natthew's Instagram

Official Fanclub links:
NatthewClub The Official FC Natthew website (Thailand) 
NatthewClub's Twitter
 Natthewclub's Facebook Fanpage 
 NatthewClub's Instagram
 TaladNatthew's Facebook Fanpage
 TaladNatthew's Instagram

1989 births
Living people
Nat Thewphaingam
Nat Thewphaingam
Nat Thewphaingam
Nat Thewphaingam
Nat Thewphaingam
Nat Thewphaingam
Nat Thewphaingam
Nat Thewphaingam